Infanta Maria Francisca of Braganza; full name: Maria Francisca de Assis da Maternidade Xavier de Paula e de Alcântara Antónia Joaquina Gonzaga Carlota Mónica Senhorinha Sotera e Caia de Bourbon e Bragança; 22 April 1800 – 4 September 1834) was a Portuguese infanta (princess) daughter of King John VI of Portugal and his spouse Carlota Joaquina of Spain.

Biography 
Maria was born in Queluz, Portugal.  On 22 September 1816 in Madrid, she married her uncle Infante Carlos Maria Isidro of Spain, "Count of Molina". The couple had three children:

 Infante Carlos, Count of Montemolin (1818–1861)
 Juan, Count of Montizón (1822–1887)
 Infante Fernando (1824–1861)

In 1833, Maria Francisca, her husband and children were exiled from Spain because they refused to recognize Isabella II as heiress to the Spanish throne. They went first to Portugal and then to Alverstoke, Hampshire, UK. While in Hampshire, Maria became ill and died on 4 September 1834. 

A crowd of several thousand were known to have visited the village to pay their respects as her body lay at the rectory of St Mary's Gosport, where her funeral was held and a marble stone honours her memory. Although initially interred in St Mary's Catholic Church Gosport, Maria Francisca's remains were later transferred to Trieste Cathedral in Italy, where the Carlist pretenders and their wives are buried. 

Four years after her death, Carlos remarried, to Maria Francisca's own sister Maria Teresa, Princess of Beira.

Ancestry

References

|-

1800 births
1834 deaths
Portuguese infantas
Spanish countesses
House of Braganza
House of Bourbon (Spain)
19th-century Portuguese people
19th-century Portuguese women
People from Queluz, Portugal
Knights Grand Cross of the Order of the Immaculate Conception of Vila Viçosa
Dames of the Order of Saint Isabel
Daughters of kings